Poolside may refer to:

 Poolside (band), a Los Angeles "Daytime Disco" band
 Poolside (album), 1986, by Nu Shooz
 The area surrounding a swimming pool